Agonum acuticolle is a species of beetle in the family Carabidae.

References

acuticolle
Beetles described in 1864